Chiang Mai Football Club (Thai: สโมสรฟุตบอลจังหวัดเชียงใหม่), formerly known as Chiang Mai United F.C., is a Thai professional football club based in Chiang Mai province, a province located in the northern part of Thailand. The club plays in Thai League 2. Their main home ground at Chiang Mai Municipality Stadium.

History

Based on the website Thai-Fussball.com, Chiangmai Football Club was founded in 1999 and played in Thailand Provincial League until 2007. 

In 2009 the club was restructured. They were given a new badge, new management, new nickname "Lanna Tigers" the club finished 9th in the Regional League Northern Region just to win it a year later. It qualified Chiang Mai Football Club to participate in the play-offs which they mastered successfully.

But the first-ever adventure in the Thai Division 1 League in 2011 lasted only one season. It took the side two years to bounce back. However, a second period was in limbo when club president Udonpan Jantaraviroj announced to withdraw the club and his support in the second tier. After lengthy discussions and fan protests he agreed to move on but at the end of 2016, he decides to quit the club after he managed Chiangmai Football Club for a long time.

Honours

Domestic leagues

Thai League 2
 Third place (1): 2018

Regional League Division 2:
 Runners-up (1): 2013

Regional League Northern Division
 Winners (3) : 2010, 2012, 2013

Stadium and locations by season

Season by season record

Players

First team squad

 

{{Fs
Player|no=46|nat=THA|pos=MF|name=C
hanathip Fongkan]]}}
{{FS
Player|no=47|nat=THA|pos=DF|name=P
hithak Saengkrachangchuen]]}}

{{FS
Player|no=81|nat=THA|pos=DF|name=L
ous Panmanemay]]}}

Coaching staff

Manager history
Coaches by Years (2014–present)

  Somchai Chuayboonchum 
  Wil Boessen 
  Sugao Kambe 
  Apisit Im-ampai 
  Choketawee Promrut  
  Carlos Eduardo Parreira  
  Surapong Kongthep    
  Amnaj Kaewkiew 
  Pairoj Borwonwatanadilok 
  Jun Fukuda

References

External links
 Official Website
 Official Fanclub Facebook
 Official Facebook

 
Football clubs in Thailand
Sport in Chiang Mai
Association football clubs established in 1999
1999 establishments in Thailand